The Streets, the Sounds, and the Love is the first full-length CD released by New Atlantic. It was produced by Casey Bates and Bobby Darling of Gatsby's American Dream. The CD also features a guest appearance from Will Pugh of Cartel.

Track listing
All tracks written by New Atlantic.
 "Cold- Hearted Town" (3:17)  
 "Wire and Stone" (2:41) 
 "Now That You're Gone" (3:07) 
 "You Get Me"  (3:14)
 "What It's Like to Feel Small" (3:14)  
 "I Won't Be Back" (3:21)
 "So If You Try" (2:52)
 "Safer Times"  (3:36)
 "Late Night Television" (3:14)
 "The Ever After"  (3:02)
 "The Streets, the Sounds, and the Love"  (5:18)

Personnel
Giovanni Gianni - vocals
Christopher Hindley - guitar
Dave Carlson - bass
Jacob Kalb - drums
Matthew Sztyk - guitar
Casey Bates - production, engineering, mixing
Bobby Darling - production, engineering, mixing
Will Pugh - additional vocals (on "Wire and Stone")

References

2007 debut albums